Flitcham Priory was a priory in Norfolk, England first founded by Sir Robert III Aguillon.

References

Monasteries in Norfolk